Ii Naotora (井伊 直虎, d. 12 September 1582) was a daimyō of the Sengoku period. She was the daughter and only child of Ii Naomori, the eighteenth head of their clan. She was primarily the head of Ii clan and retainer of the Imagawa clan, because of her efforts, Ii Naotora became a daimyō and received the title  "Female Landlord" (女地頭).

Naotora is best known for avoiding the decimation of her family and for continuing the lineage of Ii clan. As a relative of Lady Tsukiyama (first consort of Tokugawa Ieyasu), Naotora switched sides to the Matsudaira clan of Mikawa province. The Ii clan that Naotora as guardian of Ii Naomasa protected, prospered for over 200 years and became one of the main samurai clans that formed the Tokugawa Shogunate government.

Early life
Ii Naotora was a daughter of Ii Naomori, a leader of Iinoya-is a part of Tōtōmi, who had been defeated by Imagawa Yoshimoto and became a vassal of Imagawa.

The Ii family had no male heir, so Natora's great uncle Ii Naomitsu tried to betroth his son Ii Naochika to her so that he could inherit the clan. However, Naomitsu planned to rebel against Imagawa. Unidentified Imagawa clan retainers carried a report of the plans to Imagawa, who ordered Naomitsu and his son Naochika to commit seppuku. Naomitsu died, but Naochika, who was very young, was protected by a Buddhist priest named Nankei. Naochika managed to flee to Shinano. Naotora became a priestess, and was named Jirō Hōshi (次郎法師) at age of ten by Nankei.

When Naomori and Yoshimoto died in the Battle of Okehazama in 1560, the Imagawa clan lost power and the province descended into chaos. Naochika returned to Iinoya about ten years after he left. He had already married another woman while in exile and could not marry Jiro Hoshi.

Naochika momentarily ruled the clan but, like his father, he planned a rebellion against the Imagawa. Again, anonymous traitors carried news of the plans to the Imagawa and Naochika was killed by Imagawa Ujizane in 1560. It is said that he was killed because of an anonymous report by Ono Michiyoshi. In 1563, Ii Naohira (Naotora's grandfather) and other men from Ii, were ordered to break into Hikuma Castle as proof of their loyalty to the Imagawa. Otazu no Kata who was wife of Iio Tsurutatsu (lord of Hikuma castle) invited Naohira to a meeting with her husband and planned to eradicate it to claim prominence in Totomi. On September 18, Otazu no Kata then poisoned Naohira's tea and he died soon after. Following Naohira's death and many obstacles, Jiro Hoshi returned to secular life, removed her nun costume, was baptized by the male name Naotora and declared herself the nominal head of the Ii clan.

Reign 
After the Imagawa clan killed several members of the Ii clan, Naotora became one of the last survivors, alongside her mother and niece (Takasehime). She adopted Naochika's daughter and son, Takase and Ii Naomasa. Naotora secured Naomasa's future successful career when he succeeds her. She managed a small province that was surrounded by some of the most powerful clans of its time, Matsudaira, Takeda and Imagawa.

During the early days of her reign, Naotora often tried to mediate with Imagawa Ujizane and his grandmother Jukei-ni, at which time the Imagawa clan was on warpath with Ii clan. Former Imagawa clan retainer Tokugawa Ieyasu went to war with Ujizane. Ieyasu was successful in forming an alliance with Oda Nobunaga after Yoshimoto's death in 1560. Ieyasu's wife was Lady Tsukiyama, who was from the Imagawa family and related to Naotora.

In 1564 Niino Chikanori, a retainer of Ii clan, led a siege to Hikuma castle to prove Naotora's loyalty to Imagawa Ujizane; Otazu and Tsurutatsu fought to defend the castle and Chikanori was killed. Naotora was presumed to have difficulty securing clan leadership because of the innumerable resistances from the Imagawa clan retainers, so she anonymously seeks support from other clans. After numerous threats from Imagawa retainers to Ii, Naotora finally allies with Ieyasu and actively participates in the achievements of the Matsudaira clan in Totomi and Mikawa Province. She saw the power of her former lord decline after the strengthening of the Ieyasu's clan. 
Naotora's actions were the most important moment for her clan. She achieved Ii clan independence after more than two centuries serving the Imagawa. In some tales Naotora is portrayed as an "unconventional lord" because of her numerous strategies and unusual attempts to protect her domain and people. It is recorded that Naotora, being a former nun, often acted to avoid battles, earning the respect of many civilians. She was responsible for the development of agriculture and the substantial expansion of the domains of her clan in the region of Enshū. She actively participated in the success of Ieyasu's career that would later become the first shogun of the Tokugawa shogunate. 

In 1568, Jukei-ni died and the Imagawa entered a major crisis again and a year later. Ujizane surrendered to Ieyasu's Matsudaira clan. Ieyasu led a siege to Hikuma castle (Hamamatsu castle) and capture it from Otazu no kata. Naotora is said to have participated actively in this battle to avenge her great grandfather's death, but it is probably a tale from the Edo period.

At the same year, Ono Michiyoshi who was Naotora's ally and childhood friend, removes her from Iinoya's leadership with the help of former Imagawa's retainers. She escaped to Ryōtan-ji Temple in Hamamatsu. During her days in Hamamatsu, Naotora meet with Ieyasu and sent Naomasa to his care. After that she was closer to working with Ieyasu, she received Ieyasu's help and recaptured Iinoya castle. During days of resistance, Michiyoshi was finally captured, he was executed and his head was disgraced in public.

In 1572, Takeda Shingen personally invaded Iinoya and other castles in Totomi and Mikawa. The Battle of Mikatagahara took place near Naotora's domain. After days of resistance, Naotora surrendered Iinoya castle to the enemy to prevent bloodshed. In 1573, Shingen became sick and died in Naotora's domain. The Takeda clan army retreats from Iinoya and Naotora returned to being a daimyō. In 1582, she died of disease and was buried in the Ryōtan-ji temple. Naochika's son, the famed Ii Naomasa whom she adopted, succeeded her after her demise.

In popular culture 

Ko Shibasaki portrayed her in the 2017 NHK Taiga drama .
 Ii Naotora appears in the Capcom video games Sengoku Basara 4 and Sengoku Basara: Sanada Yukimura-Den, voiced by Maaya Sakamoto.
 She appears in the Koei Tecmo video games Samurai Warriors 4, Warriors Orochi 4, Dead or Alive 5 Last Round and Warriors All-Stars, voiced by Yuka Saitō in Japanese and Erica Mendez in English (DOA5LR only).
 Ii Naotora is featured in episode27 of Meow Meow Japanese History, voiced by Yū Kobayashi

See also 
 List of female castellans in Japan
 Onna-musha

Sources

References

16th-century births
16th-century Buddhist nuns
16th-century Japanese women
16th-century women rulers
Japanese Buddhist nuns
Ii clan
Samurai
Japanese women in warfare
Women in 16th-century warfare
Daimyo
1582 deaths
16th-century Japanese people